The Ecuadorian National Olympic Committee (ECU) was created in 1948 and recognized by the IOC in 1959.

In 2012, it had its autonomy reinstated "following domestic issues whereby the Sports Ministry interfered in the activities of the National Sports Federations."

Logo

See also
 Ecuador at the Olympics

References

External links
Official website (archived)

Ecuador at the Olympics
National Olympic Committees
Oly